Parachronistis fumea is a moth of the family Gelechiidae. It is found in Japan and Russia.

References

Moths described in 1986
Parachronistis